Rahimah Stephens (22 October 1930 – 14 March 2022) was a Malaysian politician. She was the Member of Sabah State Legislative Assembly for Kiulu from 1976 to 1985. She was also the wife of Fuad Stephens, the first Chief Minister of Sabah.

Participation in NGO 
Rahimah was active in the Sabah Anti Tuberculosis Association (SABATA), Malaysian Red Crescent Society, Inner Wheel Club, National Stokees Association, and Senior Citizen Association. She was also the founder of Sabah Heart Fund (SOS).

Politics 
In 1961, Rahimah became the first Chief of Women's Wing in UPKO, the party established by her husband, Tun Fuad Stephens. After that, she joined BERJAYA together with his husband and became the Chief of Women's Wing of BERJAYA. She was then elected to become the Member of Sabah State Legislative Assembly for Kiulu after a by-election, caused by the death of her husband. On 17 July 1976, she was appointed as the Welfare Minister of Sabah and became the first female to be appointed as a Sabah cabinet member.

Election results

Health 
She passed away on 14 March 2022 due to heart attack at a private hospital after she fell down at her home and broke her bone.

Honours 
  :
  Commander of the Order of Kinabalu (PGDK) - Datuk (1971) 
  Grand Commander of the Order of Kinabalu (SPDK) - Datuk Seri Panglima (1982)

References 

20th-century Malaysian politicians
Converts to Islam from Roman Catholicism
Malaysian women in politics
Malaysian Muslims
Malaysian people of British descent
People from Sabah
United Pasokmomogun Kadazan Organisation politicians
Sabah People's United Front politicians
Members of the Sabah State Legislative Assembly
1930 births
Kadazan-Dusun people
2022 deaths
Commanders of the Order of Kinabalu
Malaysian people of English descent
Grand Commanders of the Order of Kinabalu